Giuseppe Sirtori was the lead ship of the  of destroyers built for the Italian  (Royal Navy) during World War I.

Design

They had a crew of 98 officers and enlisted men. The ships were powered by two steam turbines, with steam provided by four Thornycroft water-tube boilers.

Giuseppe Sirtori was armed with a main battery of six  guns. Her light armament consisted of a pair of  anti-aircraft guns and two  machine guns. She was also equipped with four  torpedo tubes in two twin launchers, one on each side of the ship. The ship also carried ten naval mines.

Service history
Giuseppe Sirtori was built at the  shipyard in Sestri Ponente, and was launched on 24 November 1916.

While at Corfu in the aftermath of the Italian surrender to the Allies, Giuseppe Sirtori came under aerial attack from Italy's erstwhile ally, Germany, on 14 September 1943. German bombers inflicted serious damage to the ship, and the crew ran her aground to avoid sinking. The crew later refloated the ship and took her out to the Straits of Corfu, where they scuttled the ship on 25 September to prevent her from captured by German forces.

Notes

References
 
 

 
 

 
World War I naval ships of Italy
Ships built in Italy
Ships built by Cantieri navali Odero
1916 ships
World War II torpedo boats of Italy
Maritime incidents in September 1943